Afghanistan competed at the 2014 Summer Youth Olympics, in Nanjing, China from 16 August to 28 August 2014.

Taekwondo

Afghanistan was given a wild card to compete.

Girls

References

2014 in Afghan sport
Nations at the 2014 Summer Youth Olympics
Afghanistan at the Youth Olympics